The 2017 Campeonato Carioca Série B1 was the 38th edition of the main division of football in Rio de Janeiro. The contest is organized by FERJ. from 2017, in Campeonato Carioca Série B will called Série B1. The main novelty for a season will be an inclusion of the two times demoted in the 2017 Campeonato Carioca.

The Carapebus was downgraded as Campos, however after the dispute in 2017 Campeonato Carioca the partnership between the two teams ended and the Campos joined FERJ, contending in Serie C 2017.

Participating teams

Championship round

Taça Santos Dumont
Group A

Group B

 Knockout stage

Final

Taça Corcovado
Group A

Group B

 Knockout stage

Final

Overall table

Final stage

Semi-finals

Final

References

Campeonato Carioca seasons
2017 in Brazilian football leagues